Ingrid Wacker (died 4 August 2009) was a German film editor.

Selected filmography
 On the Reeperbahn at Half Past Midnight (1954)
 My Leopold (1955)
 How Do I Become a Film Star? (1955)
 Yes, Yes, Love in Tyrol (1955)
 Black Forest Melody (1956)
 The Legs of Dolores (1957)
 Doctor Bertram (1957)
 The Copper (1958)
 The Muzzle (1958)
 Iron Gustav (1958)
 Peter Shoots Down the Bird (1959)
 Of Course, the Motorists (1959)
 Adorable Arabella (1959)
 We Will Never Part (1960)
 Heaven, Love and Twine (1960)
 The Red Hand (1960)
 You Must Be Blonde on Capri (1961)

References

Bibliography
 Cowie, Peter. World Filmography. Tantivy Press, 1968.

External links

Year of birth unknown
2009 deaths
German film editors
Film people from Hamburg
German women film editors